Four Mile Township is a township in Polk County, Iowa, United States.

History
Four Mile Township was established in 1847. It took its name from Fourmile Creek.

References

Townships in Polk County, Iowa
Townships in Iowa
1847 establishments in Iowa